Bamba is a rural commune of the Cercle of Koro in the Mopti Region of Mali. The commune contains 14 villages and in the 2009 census had a population of 13,610. Most of the population of the commune are Dogon. The administrative centre (chef-lieu) is the village of Déguéré.

See also
Déguéré

References

External links
.

Communes of Mopti Region